Offing David is a 2008 Australian crime/mystery film. It was directed by Jeff Bays, and was filmed in Sydney, New South Wales in 2007. It was one of the first on-screen roles for Australian actors Nathaniel Buzolic and Adam J. Yeend.

Plot
Two mates (Richie Harkham and Adam J. Yeend) get into more than they can handle when a plan to off popular jock David (Nathaniel Buzolic) goes wrong.

Cast 
 Richie Harkham as Adam
 Adam J. Yeend as Matt
 Brendan Clearkin as Richard Clarke
 Asha Kuerten as Sarah
 Nathaniel Buzolic as David
 Sascha Raeburn as Jane
 Russell Jeffrey as Kevin
 Thomas Bromhead as Tennis Announcer

External links
Official website

References

2008 films
Australian crime comedy films
2000s crime comedy films
Films set in Australia
2000s comedy mystery films
2008 comedy films
2000s Australian films